William Fraser may refer to:

Military people 
William W. Fraser (1844–1915), American Civil War soldier and Medal of Honor recipient
William Archibald Kenneth Fraser (1886–1969), British army officer
William Fraser (British Army officer) (1890–1964), British army officer
William M. Fraser III (born 1952), United States Air Force general

Politicians 
 William Fraser, of Fraserfield  (1691–1727), Scottish landowner and politician, MP for Elgin Burghs 1722–25
William Fraser (Clerk of the Signet) (died 1802), British politician, Clerk of the Signet and an Undersecretary of State
Sir William Fraser, 4th Baronet (1826–1898), English politician
William Fraser (New Zealand politician, born 1827) (1827–1901)
William Fraser (Canadian politician) (1832–1909), member of the Legislative Assembly of Northwest Territories, 1872–1875
William Fraser (New Zealand politician, born 1840) (1840–1923)
William Alexander Fraser (politician) (1886–1962), Canadian politician
Ian Fraser, Baron Fraser of Lonsdale or William Jocelyn Ian Fraser (1897–1974), British politician and chairman of St Dunstan's

Sportspeople 
William Lovat Fraser (1884–1968), Scottish cricketer and rugby union player
Willie Fraser (footballer) (1929–1996), Australian footballer who played for A.F.C. Sunderland
Willie Fraser (born 1964), baseball player
William Fraser (rugby union) (born 1989), Saracens F.C. Academy Player

Other people 
William Alexander Fraser (writer) (1859–1933), Canadian writer
William Fraser (bishop of St Andrews) (died 1297), Bishop of St Andrews, Guardian of Scotland
William Fraser, 12th Lord Saltoun (1654–1715), Scottish peer and the 11th Laird of Philorth
William Fraser (British administrator), working in Madras, India, 1709–1711
William Fraser (bishop of Arichat) (1779–1851), Canadian Roman Catholic bishop
William Fraser (British India civil servant) (1784–1835)
William Fraser (historian) (1816–1898), professor of Scottish history
William Fraser (architect) (1867–1922), Scottish architect
William Mackenzie Fraser (1878–1960), New Zealand labourer, civil engineer and ethnological collector
William Fraser, 1st Baron Strathalmond (1888–1970), Scottish businessman and chairman of the Anglo-Iranian Oil Company
William Kerr Fraser (1929–2018), British civil servant and University of Glasgow vice-chancellor
William Fraser, 3rd Baron Strathalmond (born 1947), Scottish peer

See also
Bill Fraser (disambiguation)
William Frazer (disambiguation)